Me-Dam-Me-Phi is the most important Ancestor worship communal festival in the Ahom religion celebrated by the Ahom people on 31 January every year in memory of the departed. It is the manifestation of the concept of ancestor worship that the Ahoms share with other peoples originating from the Tai stock. It is a festival to show respect to the departed ancestors and remember their contribution to society.

Etymology
Mae Dam Mae Phi is one of the important festival observed by the Tai-Ahom from very ancient times. The word ‘Me’ means offerings. ‘Dam’ means ancestors and ‘Phi’ means gods. So the word ‘Mae Dam Mae Phi’ means oblations offered to the Ancestors spirits.

Origin
The Ahoms have their own tenets and faith. From the Ahom Chronicles it can be known that when Lengdon, the king of Mong Phi (The heavenly kingdom), sent two of his grandsons Khunlung and Khunlai to Mong Ri, present Xishuangbanna, China at that moment Ye-Cheng-Pha the God of knowledge advised them to perform Umpha, Phuralong, Mae Dam Mae Phi and Rik-khwan worships in different months of a year on different occasions to pay respect to the Phi-Dam (Ancestral Spirit) and Khwan elements. Since that day till now Mae Dam Mae Phi has been observed by all the Tai-Ahom.

History
There are several instances of performing this festival by the Ahom Kings. In the Ahom Buranji translated by G.C. Boruah, it is mentioned that king Suhungmung after defeating the Kacharis on the banks of the river Dhansiri in 1563 occupied the whole of the Dhansiri valley along with the northern portion of the Kolong river. As was the prevailing tradition king Suhungmung in order to commemorate this victory performed both the Mae Dam Mae Phi and Rikhwan festival in his capital desiring longevity of him and his subjects. King Sukhampha alias Khura Raja realizing danger from the Koches made an alliance with the Koch king and after this successful alliance the king performed Me Dam Me Phi in his capital. King King Pratap Singha thrice performed the Me Dam Me Phi festival. First, it was performed in 1606 A.D. after the defeat of the Mughals at the confluence of the rivers Kopili and Mora Doiyang. Second time in 1615 A.D. after defeating the Mughals at Agia Bandha. He performed this festival for the third time in order to seek blessings from his ancestors after his defeat at the hands of the Mughals. King Supangmung performed Me Dam Me Phi because suspicion arose in his mind that during his reign the State faced many dangers including loss of many lives in the battles of Hajo and Kan’ at the hands of the Mughals because he did not offer worship to his deceased brother Surampha.

During the reign of King Sunyeophaa when a wooden beam of the royal court suddenly collapsed, astrologers suggested the king, to perform Me Dam Me Phi and the king also did accordingly. King Sudingphaa after the cremation of his brother Suklingphaa at Charaideo under a Nuni tree performed the ancestor worship by performed the Me Dam Me Phi. Thus it is seen that the Ahom kings performed Me Dam Me Phi on many occasions for averting any imminent danger, commemorating the victory and desiring longevity of life.

Ceremonies
When Mae Dam Mae Phi is observed publicly worship is offered in the name of three gods and they are Me Dam Me Phi, Dam Changphi and Grihadam. God Dam Chao Phi is associated with the belief of some natural powers like creation and destruction, water, lightning and storm, sun, moon, learning, diseases, earth, etc. Worship is done by Ahom priests Deodhai and Bailung by chanting Ahom language mantras and following the codes given in the Manuscripts (books) like Phralung and Banfi, etc. God Dam Chang Phi is the ancestor God from sixth to the fourteenth generation of a family. Grihadam is also the ancestor God up to the fourth generation of a family. Worship to Grihadam is offered in the month of Kati at the time of harvesting new Ahu rice, in the month of Aghon at the time of harvesting new Sali Dhan and at the time of three Bihus.

On the day of Me-Dam Me Phi worship is offered only to Chaufi and Dam Chaufi because they are regarded as gods of heaven. Changphi and Grihadam are not worshipped on that day because they are regarded as earthly gods.

The Ahoms believe that a man after his death remains as ‘Dam’(ancestor) only for a few days and soon he becomes ‘Phi’ (God). They also believe that the soul of a man which is immortal unites with the supreme soul, possesses the qualities of a spiritual being and always blesses the family. So every Ahom family in order to worship the dead establish a pillar on the opposite side of the kitchen (Barghar) which is called ‘Damkhuta’ where they worship the dead with various offerings like homemade wine, egg  with handoh(a kind of rice powder) with various items of vegetarian dishes.

Significance
Mae Dam Mae Phi not only reflects the manners and customs of the Ahoms but also helps to create unity, feeling of brotherhood and mutual understanding among the new generation.

Me Dam Me Phi and its significance
Me Dam Me Phi is one of the important festivals observed by the Ahoms from very ancient times. The word ‘Me’ means offerings. ‘Dam’ means ancestors and ‘Phi’ means gods. So the word ‘Me Dam Me Phi’ means oblations offered to the dead and sacrifices to gods. This festival is observed individually by a family and publicly by a king and the general people. Nowadays this festival is observed so extensively by all the people of Assam that it can better be termed as a festival rather than worship.

The Ahoms perform this worship annually in honour of their ancestors. They believe that a man after his death remains as ‘Dam’(ancestor) only for a few days and soon he becomes ‘Phi’ (God). They also believe that the soul of a man which is immortal Unites with the supreme soul, possesses the qualities of a spiritual being and always blesses the family.

So every Ahom family in order to worship the dead establish a pillar on the opposite side of the kitchen (Barghar) which is called ‘Damkhuta’ where they worship the dead with various offerings like homemade wine, mah-prasad, rice with various items of meat and fish. The Ahom kings performed this worship after victory in wars and to ward off any imminent danger of the State.

The Ahoms had their own tenets and faith. From the Ahom chronicles it can be known that when Lengdan, the God of heaven, sent two of his grandsons Khunlung and Khunlai to earth by a golden chain at that moment Gasingpha, the God of knowledge advised them to perform Umpha, Phuralong, Medam Me Phi and Rikhwan worships in different months of a year on different occasions. Since that day till now Me Dam Me Phi has been observed by all the Ahoms.
Rikhan* is performed before going to war. It is believed that this worship gave long life to Soldiers. They ( the Soldiers) took bamboo made fish catching equipment and went to "Borpukhuri" (A large pond). Whatever they get during fishing like fishes, frog, aquatic animals, etc., they put them on Cooking utensils Alive during cooking and Served soldiers. It is believed that this ritual gives longevity and they became undefeated.

When Me Dam Me Phi is observed publicly worship is offered in the name of three gods and they are Me Dam Me Phi, Dam Changphi and Grihadam. God Dam Chao Phi is associated with the belief of some natural powers like creation and destruction, water, lightning and storm, sun, moon, learning, diseases, earth, etc.

Worship is done by Ahom priests Deodhai and Bailung by chanting Tai mantras and following the codes given in the Manuscripts like Phralung and Banfi, etc. God Dam Chang Phi is the ancestor God from sixth to the fourteenth generation of a family. Grihadam is also the ancestor God up to the fourth generation of a family. Worship to Grihadam is offered in the month of Kati at the time of harvesting new Ahu rice, in the month of Aghon at the time of harvesting new Sali Dhan and at the time of three Bihus.

On the day of Me Dam Me Phi worship is offered only to Chaufi and Dam Chaufi because they are regarded as gods of heaven. Changphi and Grihadam are not worshipped on that day because they are regarded as earthly gods.

There are several instances of performing this festival by the Ahom kings. In the Ahom Buranji translated by G.C. Boruah it is mentioned that Suhungmung after defeating the Kacharis on the banks of the river Dhansiri in 1563 occupied the whole of the Dhansiri valley along with the northern portion of the Kolong river.

As was the prevailing tradition king Suhungmung in order to commemorate this victory performed both the Me Dam Me Phi and Rikhan festival in his capital desiring longevity of him and his subjects. Sukhampha  realizing danger from the Koches made an alliance with the Koch king and after this successful alliance the king performed Me Dam Me Phi in his capital.

King Susenghphaa thrice performed the Me Dam Me Phi festival. First, it was performed in 1606 A.D. after the defeat of the Muslims at the confluence of the rivers Kapili and Mora Doiyang. Second time in 1615 A.D. after defeating the Muslims at Agia Bandha. He performed this festival for the third time in order to seek blessings from his ancestors after his defeat at the hands of the Mughals.

King Supangmung performed Me Dani Me Phi because suspicion arose in his mind that during his reign the State faced many dangers including loss of many lives in the battles of Hajo and Kan’ at the hands of the Mughals because he did not offer worship to his deceased brother Suramphaa.

During the reign of Sunyeophaa when a wooden beam of the royal court suddenly collapsed, astrologers suggested the king, to perform Me Dam Me Phi and the king also did accordingly.

King Sudingphaa after the cremation of his brother Kamaleswar Singha at Charaideo under a Nuni tree performed the ancestor worship by donating gold and silver to the Brahmins and even performed the Me Dam Me Phi.

Thus it is seen that the Ahom kings performed Me Dam Me Phi on many occasions for averting any imminent danger, commemorating the victory and desiring longevity of life. This festival not only reflects the manners and customs of the Ahoms but also helps to create unity, feeling of brotherhood and mutual understanding among the new generation.

References

External links
 https://web.archive.org/web/20090309155047/http://assamgovt.nic.in/festival.asp
 http://www.india9.com/i9show/Mae Dam Mae Phi-65451.htm
 https://web.archive.org/web/20090131201130/http://allaboutassam.com/Festivals.html

Festivals in Assam
Religious festivals in India
Religious rituals
Ahom kingdom
January observances